Bryan Cusack (2 August 1881 – 24 May 1973) was an Irish Sinn Féin politician and medical doctor. 

Bernard Cusack was born in County Cavan in 1881, the son of draper Andrew Cusack and Catherine Dawson; at a young age his family moved to Granard, County Longford. In January 1916, in Dublin, he married Kathleen Keane.

He was elected as a Sinn Féin MP for Galway North at the 1918 general election. In January 1919, Sinn Féin MPs who had been elected in the Westminster elections of 1918 refused to recognise the Parliament of the United Kingdom and instead assembled at the Mansion House in Dublin as a revolutionary parliament called Dáil Éireann, though Cusack did not attend as he was in prison.

He re-elected unopposed as a Sinn Féin Teachta Dála (TD) for the Galway constituency at the 1921 general election. He opposed the Anglo-Irish Treaty and voted against it. He was re-elected as an anti-Treaty Sinn Féin TD for Galway at the 1922 general election but did not take his seat in Dáil Éireann. He did not contest the 1923 general election. He became a founder member of Fianna Fáil in 1926 and stood unsuccessfully for the party in Galway at the June 1927 general election. He did not contest any more elections and he resumed his medical career. He died in 1973 aged 91.

See also
List of members of the Oireachtas imprisoned during the Irish revolutionary period

References

External links

1881 births
1973 deaths
Early Sinn Féin TDs
Members of the 1st Dáil
Members of the 2nd Dáil
Members of the 3rd Dáil
Members of the Parliament of the United Kingdom for County Galway constituencies (1801–1922)
UK MPs 1918–1922
People of the Irish Civil War (Anti-Treaty side)
Politicians from County Galway
20th-century Irish medical doctors
Fianna Fáil politicians
Alumni of the University of Galway